The Barbegal aqueduct and mills is a Roman watermill complex located on the territory of the commune of Fontvieille, Bouches-du-Rhône, near the town of Arles, in southern France. The complex has been referred to as "the greatest known concentration of mechanical power in the ancient world" and the 16 overshot wheels are considered to be the largest ancient mill complex.

Another similar mill complex existed on the Janiculum in Rome, and there are suggestions that further such complexes existed at other major Roman sites, such as Amida (Mesopotamia).

Description 
The Barbegal mills are located 12 kilometres east northeast of Arles near Fontvieille, where the Arles aqueduct arrived at a steep hill. The mills consisted of 16 water wheels in two parallel sets of eight descending a steep hillside. There are substantial masonry remains of the water channels and foundations of the individual mills, together with a staircase rising up the hill upon which the mills were built. The mills operated from the beginning of the 2nd century until about the end of the 3rd century. The capacity of the mills has been estimated at 4.5 tons of flour per day, enough to supply bread for as many as 10,000 of perhaps 30–40,000 inhabitants of Arelate at that time. It is thought that the wheels were overshot water wheels with the outflows driving successive wheels to the base of the hill.

The Roman aqueducts that fed the mills were also built to supply water to the town of Arles (then called Arelate). The two aqueducts joined just north of the mill complex and a sluice controlled the water supply to the complex.

Other mills

Vertical water mills were well known to the Romans, being described by Vitruvius in his De architectura of 25 BC, and mentioned by Pliny the Elder in his Naturalis Historiæ of 77 AD. There are also later references to floating water mills from Byzantium and to sawmills on the river Moselle by the poet Ausonius. The use of multiple stacked sequences of reverse overshot water wheels was widespread in Roman mines, especially in Spain and Wales. It is possible that the mills at Barbegal may also have been used for sawing timber and stone when not grinding wheat. The Hierapolis sawmill from the 3rd century AD shows a crank-activated frame saw being used in this way, and another has been excavated at Ephesus.

Visiting the site
Visitors to Barbegal may park where a minor road (Route de L’Aqueduc) crosses the massive remains of the original aqueduct, and, with olive orchards on either side, walk south about 250 meters along the remains of the aqueduct and through the three meter deep rock-hewn cleft emerging at the top of the mill complex. The site is signposted as "Roman aqueduct" rather than as a mill. The Arles Museum of Antiquity has an informative reconstructed model of the mill. The site is currently overgrown, and care is needed exploring the ruins.

Influence
The English science historian James Burke examines Roman watermill technology such as that of the Barbegal aqueduct and mill, concluding that it influenced the Cistercians and their waterpower, which in turn influenced the Industrial Revolution, in the fourth of his ten-part Connections, called "Faith in Numbers".

See also
 List of Roman watermills
 Roman technology
 Roman engineering

References

Further reading 
 Amouretti, M.-C.: 'Barbegal: de l'histoire des fouilles a l'histoire des moulins', Provence Historique, 167-8 (1992), pp. 135–49
 Bellamy, R. B. & Hitchner, P.- S.: 'The villas of the Vallee des Baux and the Barbegal Mill: excavations at la Merindole villa and cemetery', Journal of Roman Archaeology 9 (1996), pp. 154–76
 Benoit, F.: 'L'usine de meunerie hydraulique de Barbegal (Arles)', Revue Archéologique, sixième série 15.1 (1940), pp. 19–80
 Bromwich, J, 'The Roman Remains of Southern France', Routledge, 1996, pp. 156–60
 Cleere, Henry, 'Southern France', "Oxford Archaeological Guides", 2001, pp 119–120
 Coulard, G, and Golvin, J-C, 'Voyage en Gaule Romaine, Actes Sud-France, 2002', pp 124–127
 Hodge, A.T.: 'A Roman factory', Scientific American (November 1990), pp. 58–64
 Leveau, P.: 'The Barbegal water-mill in its environment: archaeology and the economic and social history of antiquity', Journal of Roman Archaeology 9 (1996), pp. 137–53
 Lorenz, Wayne F., and Phillip J. Wolfram: The millstones of Barbegal (Possible usage of flour mill in Barbegal, France for testing designs of millstones). Civil Engineering, 77.6, June 2007, pp. 62–67
 Lorenz, and Wolfram: 'Arches have no rivals (Unique Roman bridges offer clues as to how it was done centuries ago)', Roads and Bridges, September 2007, pp 28–50
 Sagui, C.L.: 'La meunerie de Barbegal (France) et les roues hydrauliques chez les anciens et au moyen age', Isis, Vol. 38, No. 314. (Feb., 1948), pp. 225–231
 Sellin, R.H.J.: The large Roman water mill at Barbegal (France), History of Technology, 8, 1983, pp. 91–109

External links 

 The Millstones of Barbegal, Civil Engineering, ASCE
 Valley Crossings and Flood Management for Ancient Roman Aqueduct Bridges, Journal of Irrigation and Drainage (ASCE)
 Barbegal Arches in 'Arches have no rivals'
 The Roman Flour Mill at Barbegal
 The Report of Field Investigations of the Barbegal Mill and Aqueduct System
 
 Description of Mill site and aqueducts
 Photographs of site

Roman aqueducts in France
Ancient Roman watermills
Roman sites in Provence
Buildings and structures in Bouches-du-Rhône
Tourist attractions in Bouches-du-Rhône
Ruins in Provence-Alpes-Côte d'Azur
Watermills in France
Flour mills